Gilberte de Courgenay  is a 1942 Swiss biographical film directed by Franz Schnyder and starring Rudolf Bernhard, Anne-Marie Blanc and Zarli Carigiet.

Story 
The Film was based on a novel by Rudolf Bolo Maeglin and based on the story of the real Gilberte de Courgenay (actually Gilberte Montavon), who was a servant in a hotel in Courgenay, a small town near the Swiss-French border. She served thousands of Swiss soldiers that were stationed in Courgenay during the First World War, when the neutral Switzerland had to protect its borders. Hanns In der Gand made the song La petite Gilberte de Gourgenay by Robert Lustenberger and Oskar Portmann from the Winter 1915/16 very famous across Switzerland. The popularity of this song quickly resulted in Gilberte becoming an idol for the soldats that had to keep watch far from home and their families.

The film is a love story around Gilberte de Courgenay (played by Anne-Marie Blanc). In the winter of 1915/16 the artillery battalion 38 is sent to Courgenay. Initially assuming that the war will soon be over, they're disappointed when they hear that they won't be able to celebrate Christmas at home. Gilberte organises a Christmas celebration for the soldiers and so becomes their idol. Secretly, she loves Peter Hasler (Erwin Kohlund), who is upset because his fiancee Tilly (Ditta Oesch) is not answering his letters.

When a colleague of Hasler has to travel to Berne with a sick horse, he finds out why: Tilly's rich father had seized all the letters from Peter because he thought that he was not appropriate for her. Tilly immediately travels to the Jura when she discovers this.

She finds Peter just during the most famous part of the film: When he sings La petite Gilberte in the Hôtel de la Gare in Courgenay adoring Gilberte. But Gilberte steps back and leaves Peter to Tilly.

Creation 
The film was made during the Second World War, in an attempt to raise national morale in the face of potential invasion (so called Geistige Landesverteidigung; Spiritual national defence).

Cast
Rudolf Bernhard: René Gengenbach
Anne-Marie Blanc: Gilberte Montavon
Zarli Carigiet: Luzi Caviezel
Hélène Dalmet: Madame Montavon
Heinrich Gretler: Friedrich Odermatt
Max Knapp: Fritz Gubler
Erwin Kohlund: Peter Hasler
Ditta Oesch: Tilly Odermatt
Schaggi Streuli: Gustav Hannart
Jakob Sulzer: Otto Helbling
Heinz Woester: Hauptmann/Captain

External links

1942 films
Swiss historical drama films
1942 drama films
1940s historical drama films
Swiss German-language films
1940s French-language films
Films directed by Franz Schnyder
Swiss biographical drama films
World War I films based on actual events
Swiss black-and-white films
1940s biographical drama films
1940s multilingual films
Swiss multilingual films